The Greatest Salesman in the World is a book, written by Og Mandino, that serves as a guide to a philosophy of salesmanship, and success, telling the story of Hafid, a poor camel boy who achieves a life of abundance. The book was first published in 1968, and re-issued in 1983 by Bantam. A hardcover edition was published by Buccaneer Books in June, 1993.  In 1970, Success Motivation Institute purchased the rights to produce the audio recording.

If Mandino's suggested reading structure is followed, it would take about 10 months to read the book.

The instructions are to read Scroll I (Chapter 8) three times a day for thirty days straight. Only after completing the thirty days of reading Scroll I, should you continue to Scroll II (Chapter 9) and so forth through Scroll X (Chapter 17).

The book's philosophy
Mandino composed The Legend Of The Ten Scrolls. They are:

 Scroll I - I will Form Good Habits and Become their Slave
 Scroll II - Greet Each Day With Love In Your Heart
 Scroll III - I Will Persist Until I Succeed
 Scroll IV - I am Nature's Greatest Miracle
 Scroll V - Live Each Day as if it Were Your Last 
 Scroll VI - Master Your Emotions
 Scroll VII - The Power of Laughter 
 Scroll VIII - Multiply Your Value Every Day
 Scroll IX - All is Worthless Without Action
 Scroll X - Pray to God for Guidance
This is a book on the philosophy of life, and is not just applicable to being a great salesman.

His primary message was to "do it now".  In the marking of Scroll IX,  "I will act now" is written 18 times.  Actor Matthew McConaughey cited this book as having changed his life. The book is also recommended by Tariq Jameel, who says that the book should be read by everyone looking for success in his life.

Quotes
"You were not created for a life of idleness. You cannot eat from sunrise to sunset or drink or play or make love. Work is not your enemy but your friend. If all manners of labor were forbidden to thee you would fall to your knees and beg an early death."

To learn and master anything, one has to pay the price in time and concentration, until it becomes part of one’s personality and habit in living.

No other trade or profession has more opportunity for one to rise from poverty to great wealth than that of salesman.

Rewards are great if one succeeds but the rewards are great only because so few succeed.

Obstacles are necessary for success because in selling, as in all careers of importance, victory comes only after many struggles and countless defeats.

The Greatest Salesman in the World part two, the end of the story
This is a sequel to Mandino's 1967 bestselling book, published in 1988 and set forty years later than the first part; the main character Hafid is in a sad state, mourning the loss of his wife, Lisha. The story starts years into Hafid’s seclusion, when a dream convinces him to see a stranger that turns up on his doorstep and pulls Hafid out of retirement to embark on a new adventure: a speaking tour to enlighten others about the principles enclosed in The Ten Scrolls.

References

Self-help books